Girl Of Your Dreams is the second record from country music singer-songwriter Bobbie Cryner.  It was her first album on MCA Records.

This disc does share some similarities with the first record; mainly that of the 10 songs, three are self-penned, two are co-written, and the others are from outside songwriters. Two of the tracks are covers: Dusty Springfield's "Son of a Preacher Man" and Dottie West's "A Lesson in Leaving."

The album featured another three singles.  The first, "I Just Can't Stand to Be Unhappy", was written by Hugh Prestwood and peaked at number 63 in 1995.  The second, "You'd Think He'd Know Me Better", charted as high as 56 in 1996.  The last single from the disc, the autobiographical "I Didn't Know My Own Strength" was released in late summer of 1996.

Track listing
"Son of a Preacher Man" (John Hurley, Ronnie Wilkins) — 2:47
"I Didn't Know My Own Strength" (Kent Blazy, Cryner, Sonny LeMaire) — 3:43
"The Girl of Your Dreams" (Cryner) — 4:06
"Vision of Loneliness" (Cryner) — 3:25
"A Lesson in Leaving" (Randy Goodrum, Brent Maher) — 2:47
"You'd Think He'd Know Me Better" (Cryner) — 4:06
"I Just Can't Stand to Be Unhappy" (Hugh Prestwood) — 3:38
"Nobody Leaves" (Cryner, David Stephenson) — 3:49
"Oh to Be the One" (Roger Murrah, Randy VanWarmer) — 2:48
"Just Say So" (Cathy Majeski, John Scott Sherrill) — 3:40

Production
Produced By Barry Beckett & Tony Brown
Engineers: Csaba Petocz
Assistant Engineers: David Hall, Amy Hughes, Daryl Roudbush
Mixing: Csaba Petocz
Mix Assistant: David Hall
Mastering: Bob Ludwig

Personnel
Drums: Eddie Bayers
Percussion: Terry McMillan
Bass guitar: Michael Rhodes
Keyboards: Steve Nathan, Bobby Ogdin
Steel Guitar: Paul Franklin
Acoustic Guitar: Don Potter
Electric Guitar: Brent Rowan
Lead Vocals: Bobbie Cryner
Background Vocals: John Wesley Ryles, Dennis Wilson, Curtis Young

Bobbie Cryner albums
1996 albums
MCA Records albums
Albums produced by Barry Beckett
Albums produced by Tony Brown (record producer)